Munir al-Saltaneh (19th-century) was a royal consort of shah Naser al-Din Shah Qajar of Persia (r. 1848–1896). 

She was known for her many donations. 

A street and the city quarter Monirieh in Teheran was named after her.

References

 

19th-century births
19th-century deaths
19th-century Iranian women
Qajar royal consorts